John Williams (born May 24, 1990) is an American politician, currently serving as a Democratic member of the West Virginia House of Delegates, representing the 51st district.

In 2018, Democrats — including Williams — swept all five seats in the 51st district, the largest multi-member district in the House. As a result, the Monongalia County delegates, all Democrats, called themselves “The Fab Five” and frequently voted and worked together on bills. This was especially notable given that there was only one Democratic member of the delegation just four years earlier, after the 2014 elections. In 2020, fellow Delegate Rodney Pyles was defeated for re-election by former Republican Delegate Joe Statler, breaking the all-Democratic delegation.

Personal life 
Williams was born on May 24, 1990, in Morgantown, West Virginia to Jacques and Janet Williams. He obtained a bachelor's degree from West Virginia University.

Electoral history

2018 election

Primary election

General election

2020 election

Primary election

General election

References

External links 

 Official website
 John Williams at West Virginia Legislature
 John Williams at Ballotpedia

Democratic Party members of the West Virginia House of Delegates
1990 births
Politicians from Morgantown, West Virginia
West Virginia University alumni
1976 births
Living people
21st-century American politicians